The women's 20 kilometres walk event at the 2019 African Games was held on 28 August in Rabat.

Results

References

20
2019 in women's athletics